Mary Read is a 1934 historical play by the British writer James Bridie and Claud Gurney, based on the life of the early eighteenth century pirate Mary Read.

After premiering at the Manchester Opera House it ran for a 108 performances in London's West End, first at His Majesty's Theatre before transferring to the Phoenix Theatre. Produced by Tyrone Guthrie, it starred Flora Robson in the title role supported by a cast that included Robert Donat, Claud Allister, Charles Farrell and Iris Hoey.

References

Bibliography
 Wearing, J.P. The London Stage 1930-1939: A Calendar of Productions, Performers, and Personnel.  Rowman & Littlefield, 2014.

1934 plays
Plays based on real people
Plays based on actual events
Cultural depictions of Mary Read
West End plays
Plays set in the 18th century
Plays by James Bridie